John Isner and Jack Sock were the defending champions, but Sock could not participate due to injury. Isner played alongside Sam Querrey, but lost in the first round to Pierre-Hugues Herbert and Nicolas Mahut.

Nikola Mektić and Horacio Zeballos won the title, defeating Łukasz Kubot and Marcelo Melo in the final, 4–6, 6–4, [10–3].

Seeds

Draw

Finals

Top half

Bottom half

References

External Links
 Main Draw

BNP Paribas Open – Men's Doubles
2019 BNP Paribas Open